The Battle of Lesnaya was one of the major battles of the Great Northern War. The Swedes were escorting a supply column of more than 4,500 wagons for their main army in Ukraine.

Peter I intercepted Lewenhaupt's column before it reached the safety of Charles XII, the Swedish king, with the intention of destroying it. After eight hours of fighting, with heavy casualties, neither side stood as winner. As the night approached the Russians decided to withdraw to the nearest forest where they would stay until next morning to continue the fight. The Swedes however stayed in their battle formations for hours during the night, in case of a renewed attack. With no sign of further combat and intelligence saying further Russian reinforcements had arrived, the Swedes in turn withdrew from the place of battle, in order to continue the march towards the main army. Fearing a full-scale Russian pursuit, Lewenhaupt decided to burn or abandon most of the wagons and cannons in order to increase speed. While doing this many of the Swedish soldiers decided to loot the abandoned wagons and get drunk, thousands got lost in the woods, many of whom fell victim to Russian irregular cavalry. Lewenhaupt soon crossed the river of Sozh with the rest of his army, to find himself relatively safe. After some days he met up with Charles XII at Rukova with very few wagons left and only half of his initial army. The two soon continued their march towards Ukraine, eventually finding themselves at the Battle of Poltava and the surrender at Perevolochna which severely crippled the Swedish army and is known for being the turning point of the war.

Background

In 1700 Sweden, under Charles XII, was attacked by a coalition of Saxony, Russia, and Denmark–Norway. Saxony, under Augustus II, invaded Swedish Livonia and quickly attacked the city of Riga. Meanwhile, Denmark–Norway under Frederick IV of Denmark attacked the Swedish allied duchies of Holstein and Gottorp in order to secure his rear, before commencing with the planned invasion of Scania, which had been previously annexed by Sweden in the Treaty of Roskilde in 1658. A short time later, Russia under Peter I swept into Swedish Ingria and besieged the strategic city of Narva. Unprepared for these developments, the Swedes were forced into a war on three fronts.

Denmark–Norway was quickly knocked out of the war by a bold Swedish landing on Humlebæk resulting in the Peace of Travendal. After this the Russians were forced to abandon their campaign in Ingria after their crushing defeat in the battle of Narva. The Swedes next beat the Saxons, Poles and Russians at the battle of Düna. Soon Sweden invaded the Polish–Lithuanian Commonwealth in order to remove Augustus from the Polish throne. The subsequent conflict became known as the Swedish invasion of Poland. After several defeats in the battles of Kliszów, Kraków, Pultusk and Toruń, Augustus was finally dethroned in favor of a monarch installed by the Swedes, Stanisław Leszczyński who was crowned king in 1705. During this time, the Russians had been able to capture several Swedish possessions in their Baltic Dominions, among others, the fortresses of Nöteborg, Nyenskans, Dorpat and Narva.

In 1705 the two sides prepared for a final confrontation in the Polish–Lithuanian Commonwealth, the Russians intervened with full force in order to put Augustus back on the throne. After the battles of Gemauerthof, Warsaw, Grodno and Fraustadt the campaign was decided in favor of the Swedes who chased their enemies out of Poland in 1706 and subsequently invaded Saxony, where Augustus saw himself defeated and forced to make peace. Seeing how only one major threat remained, the Swedes decided to invade Russia in 1707. After some time of fighting against the Russians under Peter I, the Swedish king soon called upon reinforcements from Livonia where Adam Ludwig Lewenhaupt was acting Commander-in-chief.

Prelude
In early April 1708, the governor of Riga, Adam Ludwig Lewenhaupt visited Charles XII at the Royal army's winter quarters in Radoszkowice to discuss strategy and receive orders for the ongoing campaign against Russia. Here he was instructed to obtain a large amount of supplies and wagons that could be sufficient for the main army for about three weeks. Once having collected the supplies Lewenhaupt would assemble as much men as possible from the area, without leaving the garrisons completely stripped. Lewenhaupt would then use these troops to escort the convoy and rendezvous with Charles' main army at Mogilev, in early August.

In May same year, Lewenhaupt returned to Riga in order to complete the task, which proved far from easy. The near lands had suffered many campaigns in the years of the Great Northern War and so much was drained of needed resources. In early June, the column—of which Lewenhaupt was gathering—was ordered to start campaigning to reach Charles XII in Mogilev, according to schedule. However, the convoy was nowhere ready to leave because of the difficulties assembling it. Only in the beginning of July it was ready, having then suffered three to four weeks behind the schedule and a significant shortage of men as 20,000 men were expected, but only 13,000 soldiers proved able to march.

Lewenhaupt's convoy
 
The march turned out slower than expected, torrential rain turned the roads into mud, streams became over flooded which turned out to be a major task to cross and so, unfortunately for Lewenhaupt and Charles, the expected time of arrival kept moving back. However, after several weeks of waiting and no words heard from Lewenhaupt, there was a twist to the plans as Charles found his position in Mogilev unsustainable and instead on September 26, decided to abandon his camps and march South towards Severia in Ukraine, hoping to reach that rich granary before winter. During this time Lewenhaupt was about 135 kilometers (90 miles) away from Charles and on September 28, he received new orders to rendezvous at Starodub and started marching south himself. His convoy passed between Mogilev and Gorki heading for Propoisk on the river Sozh. By October 3, Lewenhaupt had crossed the Dnieper and headed south, the crossing itself has to be considered a "military masterpiece". Having observed these movements, Peter I dispatched an army under Boris Sheremetev after Charles and gathered a force of his own to intercept with Lewenhaupt. The Russians made contact with Lewenhaupt's convoy on October 6, and immediately started harassing it, forcing the Swedes to march in defensive formation across difficult terrain while the numbers of shadowing Russian troops steady grew.

Peter I, who overestimated the Swedish force being 16,000 men strong, had gathered numbers far superior to those of Lewenhaupt and was eager to catch his convoy while it was still out of reach of Charles' main army and safety. He planned to destroy the convoy before its crossing of the river Sozh where it would otherwise reach—as Peter thought—the protection of the main army (the Russians had misleading reports saying Charles was 25 kilometers away from Sozh and not 120 as they had previously presumed). On October 7, the Russians in the area were large enough that they posed a considerable threat to the convoy and so the two sides confronted each other for some time at the village of Belitsa. Subsequently, however, Lewenhaupt ordered a cavalry attack consisting of 4,000 men on the equally numbered Russian dragoons who were facing them, the Russian horse did not desire a fight and instead started retreating, persecuted by their enemies for a good four–kilometers step. In this encounter losses amounted to more than 40 Russians killed and three to eleven captured, to four wounded Swedes, a real battle did not develop as both sides parted and the confrontation ended with the quick cavalry skirmish. The Swedes however, received intelligence from the captured Russians saying the Tsar was following Lewenhaupt with a force of about 20,000 cavalry, 12,000 infantry and four guns. Later during the day, the vanguard of the convoy reached the small village of Lesnaya and there made preparations to set camp for the rest of the army, accordingly.

The next morning, Lewenhaupt, who during this time stayed with his rearguard, would once again find himself confronted as the Russians stepped up their efforts to harass the back of the convoy as it made its crossing over at Dolgij Moch, towards Lesnaya. Here the Russians under Mikhail Golitsyn and Alexander Menshikov attacked him on two fronts over the river of Resta. The engagement concluded in a standoff after four hours of musket and artillery exchange in which the Swedes successfully denied every attempt made by the Russians to cross the river for the convoy. Later the same day, Lewenhaupt reached the village of Lesnaya with most of his army and was within a day's march from Propoisk. By now he knew that Peter I was in the area with a fairly large amount of Russian troops. But he did not know exactly how large the Russian army was or if more units were on their way. Once he reached Propoisk he could cross the Sozh river and achieve relative safety in case he was the target of the whole Russian force.

Battle

On October 9, the Russians gathered all their available forces to attack the Swedes in the rear as they were crossing the stream of Lesnjanka at the village of Lesnaya, to march south against Propoisk in order to reach safety by crossing the river of Sozh. Thousands of wagons made for slow progress and bottlenecks and the scattered Swedish army was by then very vulnerable to Russian attacks. Furthermore, Bauer put a small detachment of 1,000 dragoons along with a portion of irregular troops at Propoisk to further stall the Swedish advance. The Swedish vanguard of 800 men soon stumbled upon this unit which did not hesitate to open fire. The sudden engagement put a halt to the Swedish convoy with its vanguard put in slight confusion as there was uncertainty regarding the size or position of the Russians at Propoisk. Decision was made to await orders from Lewenhaupt before committing to any course of action. In the meantime, Peter I took the advantage and pressed home the assault, marching with the majority of his troops towards Lesnaya and the rest of the Swedish convoy deployed there (at least one third of the convoy still remained at Lesnaya). Unaware of these developments, the Swedes were put in–between two forces, with an enemy no longer contented with harassment, but a decisive battle.

Opposing forces

The Swedish army was commanded by General Lewenhaupt with Berndt Otto Stackelberg assisting, it totaled around 12,500 men with 6 eight–pounder and 10 or 11 four–pounder guns. Of these, at least 2,900 men were ordered to protect and maintain the baggage convoy consisting of at least 4,500 wagons. This resulted in a reduced force of combat personal as the regiments had to be stripped on men. The exact location of the troops at the start of the battle is not certain, however, between 4,500 and 7,000 men remained on the north side of the Lesnjanka stream facing the Russian main army. About 900 of these were detached even further to the north at the Middlefield working as an outpost in order to stall possible Russian attacks. The rest of the army were on the other side of the stream towards the south, facing Propoisk and would intervene in the battle later as Lewenhaupt requested reinforcements.

The Russian army was commanded by Tsar Peter I and consisted of three divisions under generals Mikhail Mikhailovich Golitsyn, Aleksandr Menshikov, Christian Felix Bauer and Nikolai Grigorovitj von Werden. In an operational stance, the army totaled between 26,500 and 29,000 men, including between 2,500 and 5,000 irregulars (Cossacks and Kalmyks, also referred to as light cavalry), or 900 to 10,000 according to other estimates, and more than 90 artillery pieces (30 cannons and 60 six–pounder mortars). However, the division under Werden would only enjoy limited to no engagement as these troops arrived at the end of the battle. The intention of Peter I was to attack Lewenhaupt with 13,000 regular soldiers along with thousands of irregulars initially available, in order to pin him down long enough for the rest of the army to arrive. The closest division available was that of Bauer at Berezovka who marched with about 4,976 men  along with thousands of irregulars, about 900 of these had been detached at Propoisk and were the ones halting the Swedish vanguard as it tried to reach the town, the rest would find themselves at the battle–site later on during the day. The last division marching towards the battle was located at Patskovo, led by Werden and consisted of about 6,191 men, however, as previously noted, these would only take limited part in the action.

Russian attack at the Middlefield
Peter I initially split his 13,000 men into two columns, the western one consisting of 5,910 men under himself with Mikhail Mikhailovich Golitsyn assisting (in reality, Golitsyn commanded this group and Peter I worked as his assistant) and the eastern one with 7,040 soldiers led by Aleksandr Menshikov. The two columns along with the irregulars, marched toward the Middlefield between the northern and southern forest fringes. Lewenhaupt's army was behind the southern fringe and Peter I attacked from the north. Menshikov's force traversed two kilometers of road while Peter I struggled to penetrate three kilometers of dense forest.

Around 11:00, the battle began. Peter I's column under Menshikov had reached the Middlefield from the north-west, finding the 900 Swedes deployed there. Unfortunately for Menshikov, the commander of the heavily outnumbered Swedish outpost, Lieutenant Colonel Freijbourg, seized the initiative and launched a Carolean-style surprise attack which threw the Russian column into confusion, while the sudden musket and cannon fire alerted the nearby main Swedish force. After this initial success, the Swedes were forced to retreat with many wounded through the southern fringe of the forest, where they were relieved by five fresh battalions under the command of Berndt Otto Stackelberg which had marched from Lesnaya.

Meanwhile, Tsar Peter's right column had reached the Crossroads and traversed the marshes of Krivl, just south of the Middlefield, close to where Menshikov's column had been in action. Having Peter to their left flank and Menshikov to the front, Stackelberg's five Swedish battalions were now fighting two Russian columns numbering 13,000 in all. Six other Swedish battalions were on their way to the battle zone. The Russians at the Crossroads under Peter were almost routed by the Swedes and could have faced a crushing defeat, had not the Russian Guards halted their advance. The fighting at the Crossroads surged back and forth. The Russian line was strengthened by six artillery pieces. However, the Swedes who themselves had no artillery in this particular fight, were able to capture four of them and block Peter's progress at the Krivl bridge.

Facing the Swedish right flank at the Middlefield, Menshikov's guardsmen then executed a successful flanking maneuver, forcing the five Swedish battalions to retreat into the southern fringe of the forest and prepare to receive the expected Russian onslaught. Their departure left unguarded a bridge near the Crossroads, leaving it clear for Russian troops to march out and form up en masse. Thus trapped in a "pincer movement", hemmed in and outnumbered, Stackelberg—against the wishes of Lewenhaupt—ordered an orderly withdrawal. The six Swedish battalions which were yet to arrive on their march through the forest, were also ordered to retreat, an action which isolated and exposed Hälsinge's second battalion which had previously routed the Russians and now came close to being annihilated by them.

Lewenhaupt (who sought to gather his cavalry to support the Swedish infantry during the fighting at the Middlefield and Crossroads) came under attack by Russian dragoons who swept eastward through the southern fringe of the forest and headed for the Swedish dragoons deployed east of Lesnaya, on the open field. The Russians had some success at first, but as soon as the main bulk of the Swedish cavalry arrived and charged in typical Carolean wedge formation the Russian cavalry was being repulsed and quickly broke.

Tsar Peter with his Russian infantry and dragoons had now pushed away the last retreating Swedes and had full control over the southern forest edge. The Russians now strove to reach the Lesnaya field between the forest and the village of Lesnaya, to block the bridge over which the Swedes might obtain further reinforcements. (A company of 1,000 cavalry had already managed to get back to assist in the fight at Lesnaya.) A Swedish counter-offensive to push the Russians out of the forest was now ordered by Lewenhaupt, who had been very disappointed by Stackelberg's decision to retreat. The Swedes counterattacked with the support of 16 artillery pieces from Lesnaya. However the Russian troops, backed by their own 30 cannons, were too strong and the Swedes had to fall back.

Fighting at Lesnaya

The Swedes retreated almost to the village of Lesnaya and the Russians followed them to the adjacent open terrain, intending to launch a decisive attack from there. However, both sides being exhausted by the day's intense combat, hostilities were ceased at about 15:00 when, separated by only 150–200 meters, the two sides sank down on the field, facing each other, and rested. During this extraordinary interlude, in which only three Russian cannons sounded off, the two armies distributed food, water and ammunition to their ranks, issued orders and deployed reinforcements in preparation for the final conflict. Somehow during this remarkable phase, the Russian General Friedrich von Hessen-Darmstadt was shot and mortally wounded as he rode back and forth in a provocative manner between the two armies. He died of his wounds four days later. The hour-long pause concluded at about 16:00, with the arrival, after a long march, of Bauer's company of 4,000 Russian dragoons.

At a little past 16:00, the Swedes opened fire, with cannons positioned 600 meters from the southern forest edge, on the newly arrived dragoons, who were then attaching themselves to the Russians' left flank. The Russian dragoons under Bauer then—without awaiting orders from Peter I—charged against the Swedes, supported by most of the other Russian troops. The open terrain gave the Swedish army opportunity to closely coordinate its infantry and cavalry, an advantage which they gratefully seized. Repeatedly, Russian front line troops retreated from infantry Gå–På shock attacks only to find themselves under immediate attack from the rear by Swedish cavalry. However, this could only be a temporary advantage in view of the Russian reserve strength, reportedly three battalions deep by this time, enabling an irresistible grinding advance.

The Russian right flank under Mikhail Mikhailovich Golitsyn moved to secure the sole bridge across the Lesnjanka in order to prevent the flow of Swedish reinforcements across it, while seeking to trap them with their backs to the river. However, the bridge was ferociously defended and the Russians were beaten off, suffering heavy losses. At this time, both sides were inconvenienced by the weather; cold with overcast cloud cover most of the day, it gradually began to rain in which the rain quickly turned into a sudden freak snowstorm. A rare weather event for early–October, even in Russia. At 17:00, Lewenhaupt ordered a concerted attack which, however, was blunted by a tactic of continuous fire which the Russians had devised to counter the Swedish Gå–På onslaught. The Swedes took heavy casualties and were driven further back towards the village. Their line was also split in two, one side against the Lesnaya (east of the bridge) and the other against the forest to the west. The all–important bridge was on the brink of being taken when it was saved by the arrival of 900 Swedish dragoons from across the river, whose fierce onslaught drove the Russians back. At 19:00 when night fell, the Russians left the field and drew back to the forest fringe. The Swedes stood in their battle formations for several hours, expecting a night attack which did not come.

Aftermath

For a few hours the Swedes remained in their positions in case of a renewed attack and to convince the Russians that they intended to stay. Subsequently, Lewenhaupt decided to withdraw his army under the cover of the darkness and continue on his march against Propoisk. One major reason for this decision is said to have been a report coming from a captured Russian officer speaking about recent Russian reinforcements consisting of up to 10,000 men referring to the more than 6,000 strong infantry division under Nikolai Grigorovitj von Werden. Each unit slowly made its way across the stream as they were covered by the remaining units. During this progress, a number of wagons broke and partially blocked the road where the Swedish artillery was moving down, so it was decided a number of these would be sunk in the mud (to prevent them falling in Russian hands) as they were hard bringing in the rapid march. Having successfully crossed the stream with all his troops, Lewenhaupt continued towards Propoisk. However, this withdrawal was the beginning of the end for a large part of his army.

Swedish disaster
Despite the difficult condition, having men lost in the woods during the march, the Swedes reached Propoisk, only to find that the town and bridge had been burned down. This was most likely done by Bauer's detachment as they were still blocking the crossing. By now the Swedish army was disintegrating into a mob as fear grew, possibly of being trapped between Peter's army behind them and Bauer's detachment. There were also no suited material for building a bridge. The Swedes saw the risk in having the Russian army pursue them from behind and so Lewenhaupt decided that everything that could be carried be taken from the wagons, subsequently all wagons but a few, were burned and the bulk of the essential supplies within. This resulted in that a large part of the army took the opportunity to get drunk and so was left for the enemy to catch, others decided that they were better off surrendering or try to reach home by themselves. The Swedes mustered about 3,451 infantry and 3,052 cavalry at Propoisk who were in good condition to fight. Lewenhaupt decided that all the combatants would be mounted on the remaining horses to increase the speed of the march. Between 1,000 and 1,500 wounded and sick soldiers were left at Propoisk as these seemed unable to follow the pace Lewenhaupt now made in order to reach the main army. The rest were missing, perhaps as many as 4,000 men. The next morning the Russians caught up with the soldiers at Propoisk which had now increased to 3,000 men as more stragglers had joined its defenses. The Russians demanded their surrender, however as the Swedes refused and instead answered with musket fire, they soon assaulted the town. After an hour or so long defense, the Russians gained the upper hand and pushed the Swedes out of the town, further to the river of Soz, where they could escape the onslaught. The Russians were content with this and proceeded to round up any deserters they could find, however, they did not attempt to confront the main body of Lewenhaupt's army as they were allowed to withdraw unmolested.

The following day Lewenhaupt found a crossing over the river Sozh and over the next two days the soldiers swam across the river to relative safety. By now order had been restored in the Swedish army and all signs of Russian pursuit had gone. The army—now without any artillery or wagon train—made good speed to reach its rendezvous with Charles' army at Starodub. During their way, on October 19, the Swedish rearguard was attacked by reportedly 4,000 Russians at the village of Lysjtjitji. After a sharp engagement the Russians were driven off with the cost of slightly more than 30 killed and 50 wounded Swedes. On October 23, Lewenhaupt's troops reached the main army at Rukova. Having only 6,000 men left in his lines with very few of the sufficient wagons, from the train. Subsequently, Charles XII continued the march towards Ukraine where he found the condition of supplying his army better but also because a possible alliance with the Cossack hetman, Ivan Mazepa. The campaign would however end with the disastrous Swedish defeat at Poltava and the surrender of the whole army at Perevolochna, except for a few who followed the king into exile in the Ottoman Empire.

Modern look
Lesnaya is often seen as the first great Russian victory of the war and the first indication of the final result of the campaign, in Russia it is said to be the mother of Poltava. The battle was certainly proclaimed as a Russian triumph at the time, but in modern view, this may not be the case. The victorious Russian army had suffered considerable losses throughout the battle and did not manage to succeed with their goal, to crush the Lewenhaupt's army. Neither did it seriously pursue the retreating Swedish army, instead they contented themselves with catching the stragglers and march in the opposite direction of Lewenhaupt to celebrate their victory. Tsar Peter arranged for the news of the victory to be spread as much as possibly through official declarations and leaflets. At first the Russian version of events claimed they had completely destroyed a superior force, it soon became clear that this was not true so they subsequently modified it down to only equal odds. But the official declarations, leaflets etc., had already been dispatched and still influence the view of the battle today.

The two sides were in fact not equal in numbers, they only appear so in many accounts because the numbers given usually only count the initial Russian forces under the Tsar without taking in account the irregulars that accompanied the force or the later arrival of Bauer's command. Sometimes the Swedish units are also assumed to have been at full strength at the battle. Also while the initial Russian forces were about the same strength as the whole Swedish army, they did not all participate in the fighting. The Russians, in fact enjoyed a considerable numerical advantage in all stages of the battle, yet they had not been able to defeat their enemy. Similarly the Swedes were greatly constrained during the battle by the need to protect the vital wagons and their supplies.

Casualties
The estimated number of casualties sustained by both sides during the battle varies widely, depending on the source.

Swedish casualties, according to General Adam Ludwig Lewenhaupt, numbered not much more than 1,000 men during the battle itself, with a total of 1,674 dead and captured in the battle and on the road towards Propoisk. Overall, he claims, the casualties could not exceed 3,000 men in the battle and the following days (with the events at Propoisk), however, these figures are regarded as questionable and too low, according to the Swedish and Russian writers Einar Lyth and Pavel Konovalchuk. According to Lewenhaupt's Lieutenant, Friedrich Christoph von Weihe, the Swedish losses in killed amounted to 2,000 men in the battle along with a number of captured. In total, Weihe estimates that there were 3,800 Swedish casualties in the battle and in the following days. Robert Petre, a second-lieutenant in the Swedish army and veteran soldier in the Hälsinge Regiment, however, puts the total Swedish casualties at 4,549 men. According to the Russian official description regarding the Swedish casualties, 8,000 were killed on the battlefield and a total of 3,500 captured soon thereafter, other sources claim 6,700 Swedes killed and wounded in the battle and another 5,000 in the pursuit, numbers which are proven unrealistic and impossible in regards to the initial strength of the army.

Later attempts have been made by authors trying to calculate the Swedish casualties using the initial strength of the force as basis. Lewenhaupt said there were less than 10,914 men present under his command, Weihe and Petre in turn claimed there were 11,450 and 12,950 men, respectively, at the beginning of the march from Riga in early July. Nicholas Dorrell, a student in history, estimates the Swedish force at about 12,500 men strong in the battle, in an attempt to apply marching losses to the army. In regards to this, 6,500 Swedes were patterned after the battle in "condition to fight" at Propoisk, according to Petre (of which above 6,000 made it to the main army under Charles XII), about 1,000–1,500 wounded and sick Swedish soldiers along with some stragglers were left at Propoisk, of which the majority were later either killed or captured by Russian cavalry, according to Russian sources. Between 2,500 and 3,300 soldiers went missing, of which most marched on their own back towards Sweden, between 1,250 and 1,500 of these arrived and the other perished during the march due to wounds, sickness, starvation or exhaustion, or possible Cossack attacks.

Einar Lyth and Pavel Konovalchuk make an estimation calculated out of these numbers in their book "Vägen till Poltava. Slaget vid Lesnaja 1708 (The road to Poltava. The battle of Lesnaya 1708)" using the initial strength presented by Petre of 13,000 men, which concludes up to 4,000 Swedes killed, captured or dispersed in total, during the battle and the days after and no more than 2,500 men killed or captured in the battle itself. Using the same calculation on the number of 12,500 Swedes presented by Dorrell, the total losses would amount to 3,500 men and 2,000 in the battle and on the road towards Propoisk (similar estimation to that of Weihe), applying a rough estimation of 1,000–1,500 wounded to this number, representing the large numbers of wounded left at Propoisk and the ones being wounded while marching back towards Sweden, there's a possibility that the Swedes suffered 3,000–3,500 men dead, wounded and captured in the battle alone. Another estimation is made by the Russian historian Vladimir A. Artamonov in his book "The Dawn of the Poltava Victory: The Battle of Lesnaya", where the author estimates the Swedish casualties at 3,873 dead and wounded in the battle and another 877 captured afterwards, totaling losses of 4,750 Swedish soldiers, also here, using Petre's number of 12,950 Swedish soldiers as the basis for the calculation.

Russian casualties, according to Russian official claims, amounted to about 1,111 dead and another 2,856 wounded in the battle, figures which are disputed as "incomplete and contradictory", according to the Russian and Swedish writers Pavel Konovalchuk and Einar Lyth. Alexander Gordon, an officer of Scottish descent who served with the Russian army during the war, wrote a book on the history of Peter the Great, in which he puts the Russian casualties at about 3,000 killed and 4,000 wounded.

Swedish official reports declared that more than 20,000 Russians died in the battle, which is considered to be a highly unlikely number by most authors. Lewenhaupt initially estimated more than 6,000 dead and wounded Russians during the battle, but later increased that number to 9,000 dead and wounded, claiming that this estimate was reported to him by Russian officers, while he was in captivity in Moscow. Artamonov questions the reliability of this claim. Another Swedish source, Gustaf Adlerfelt, a court historian of Charles XII, declared that the Russians lost 6,000 men killed and many more wounded, referring to the "confession" of a captured Russian Adjutant-General named Schultz.

Notes

Literature

Dorrell, Nicholas. The Dawn of the Tsarist Empire: Poltava & the Russian Campaigns of 1708–1709, Partizan Press (2009)
History of the Art of War – История военного искусства / Под общ. ред П.Д. Ротмистрова. – М., 1963. – T.I. – С. 132–135.
History of the Northern War – История Северной войны. 1700–1721. / Отв. ред. И.И. Ростунов. – М., 1987. С. 73–76.
The Book of Mars or of Affairs of War – Книга Марсова или воинских дел. – Изд.2. – СПб., 1766.
Kresnovsky's History of the Russian Army, from Narva to Paris: 1700–1814 – Кресновский А.А. История русской армии: В 4-х т. – М., 1992. – T.I. От Нарвы до Парижа 1700–1814. – С. 35–36.
Letters and papers by Emperor Peter the Great – Письма и бумаги императора Петра Великого. – Т.5. – СПб., 1907.
Soviet War Encyclopaedia – Советская военная энциклопедия: В 8-й т. / Гл. ред. комис. Н.В. Огарков (пред.) и др. – М., 1977. – Т.4. – С. 624.
Strokov's History of the Art of War – Строков А.А. История военного искусства. – М., 1955. – T.I. – С. 496.

External links
Description of the battle at www.historyofwar.org (English)
Battle of Lesnaya at Hronos.km.ru (Russian)
Военный энциклопедический лексикон. СПб. Часть 8. 1844.

Lesnaya
Conflicts in 1708
1708 in Europe
Lesnaya
Lesnaya
Lesnaya
18th century in Belarus
Military history of Belarus